Kleinmachnow is a municipality of about 20,000 inhabitants in the Potsdam-Mittelmark district, in Brandenburg, Germany. It is situated South-West of the borough of Steglitz-Zehlendorf and East of Potsdam.

First mentioned in the Landbuch of Karl IV in 1375, the place played an important role at the Bäke beek / creek crossing, secured by multiple medieval castles. The last of these castles (none of which are preserved today) belonged to the Knights of Hake, a family who shaped the local history until the 20th century. The replacement of the Bäke (beek / creek) with the Teltow Canal in 1906 brought the village the now listed historic Kleinmachnow flood-gate.

In the first half of the 20th century, Kleinmachnow grew from a rural village to a suburb municipality of the Berlin Metropolitan Area. The construction of the Berlin Wall cut Kleinmachnow off from West Berlin. The community's location near the border meant it was relatively isolated in the GDR. Since the German reunification, Kleinmachnow has been part of the growth of the countryside areas outside of Berlin.

Geography
The municipality encompasses the settlement of Dreilinden.

History

Kleinmachnow arose at the former Bäke creek, today replaced by the Teltow Canal built in 1906. Parvo Machenow was first mentioned in the 1375 land registry (Landbuch) of Emperor Charles IV, then also Brandenburg Elector. In medieval times the ford was controlled by a castle, recently held by the Hake noble family. Together with the canal the Kleinmachnow lock was erected, soon becoming a landmark.

From the early 20th century the former village developed to an affluent suburb of Berlin. In 1937 Wilhelm Ohnesorge, minister of the Reichspost, acquired the Hakeburg mansion as his residence and established a large research facility of communications-electronics here. In World War II Kleinmachnow was the site of a labour camp with about 5,000 inmates, including a subcamp of Sachsenhausen.

On the night of 2–3 December 1943, a Lancaster plane of the Royal Australian Air Force (flight LM 316) was shot down over  Kleinmachnow, one of those killed being the well-known Norwegian writer and poet Nordahl Grieg, at the time serving as a war correspondent. (A memorial stone was unveiled at the site in November 2003.)

In 1946 the Socialist Unity Party of Germany (SED) seized the Hakeburg, which hosted the party's academy in the following years. From 1961 to 1989 the municipality was girded by the Berlin Wall on three sides and the motorway near Dreilinden (today Bundesautobahn 115) was the site of a major border crossing, counterpart of the Allied checkpoint Bravo in West Berlin. Since German reunification Kleinmachnow has seen a major increase of population, while the restitution of numerous plots in favour of those owners who had fled from the GDR led to fierce conflicts.

Demography

Politics

Seats in the municipal assembly (Gemeindevertretung) as of 2008 elections:
Christian Democratic Union: 6 (21.0%)
Social Democratic Party of Germany: 5 (19.7%)
The Left: 4 (13.4%)
WIR (independent): 4 (12.8%)
Alliance 90/The Greens: 3 (11.0%)
Free Democratic Party: 3 (10.3%)
BIK (independent): 2 (5.7%)
PRO (independent): 1 (3.5%)

Sports
Kleinmachnow is one of the three home towns of the basketball team TKS 49ers.

Twin towns
 Schopfheim, Germany, since 1996
 Battambang, Cambodia
 Klatovy, Czech Republic

Notable people
Lily Braun, feminist, born 2 July 1865 in Halberstadt, died 8 August 1916 in Berlin, lived in Kleinmachnow from 1909
Friedrich Kayßler, actor, born 7 April 1874 in Neurode (Nowa Ruda), died 24 April 1945 in Kleinmachnow
Arnold Schönberg, composer, born 13 September 1874 in Vienna, died 13 July 1951 in Los Angeles, lived in Kleinmachnow from 1911 to 1913
Kurt Weill, composer, born 2 March 1900 in Dessau; died 3 April 1950 in New York City, lived in Kleinmachnow from 1932 to 1933
Hanns Maaßen, writer, born 26 December 1908 in Lübeck, died 23 June 1983 in Mahlow, lived in Kleinmachnow from 1971
Margarete Sommer, humanitarian, born 21 July 1893, died 30 June 1965, lived in Kleinmachnow from 1934 to 1950
Fred Wander, writer, born 5 January 1917 in Vienna, died 10 July 2006 in Vienna, lived in Kleinmachnow from 1958 to 1983
Karl Gass, documentary filmmaker, born 2 February 1917 in Mannheim, died 29 January 2009 in Kleinmachnow, lived in Kleinmachnow from 1961 to 2009
Christa Wolf, writer, born 18 March 1929 in Landsberg an der Warthe (Gorzów Wielkopolski), died 1 December 2011 in Berlin, lived in Kleinmachnow from 1962 to 1976

References

External links

Localities in Potsdam-Mittelmark
Teltow (region)